Apstar-7 is a Chinese communications satellite which is operated by APT Satellite as part of the Apstar system. It was launched in 2012 as a replacement for the Apstar 2R satellite launched in 1997.

Apstar-7 was constructed by Thales Alenia Space, and is based on the Spacebus-4000C2 satellite bus. The satellite's solar arrays generate 11.4 kilowatts of power.

Apstar-7 was launched by a Long March 3B/E carrier rocket, flying from Launch Complex 2 at the Xichang Satellite Launch Centre. Liftoff took place at 10:27 UTC on 31 March 2012, with the rocket placing the satellite into a supersynchronous transfer orbit.

Operational history

Thales Alenia Space built Apstar-7 as an ITAR-free satellite, containing no restricted American components.  The United States prohibits the export of satellite components when a Chinese launcher will be used.  Ironically, the US Department of Defense leased bandwidth on Apstar-7 in May 2012 to improve communications with the U.S. Africa Command.  In 2013, Thales Alenia was forced to discontinue its ITAR-free satellite line after US supplier Aeroflex admitted that it had sold them ITAR-controlled components.

See also

2012 in spaceflight
List of Spacebus satellites

References

External links
International Media Switzerland  Official provider's site

Spacecraft launched in 2012
Communications satellites of China
Satellites using the Spacebus bus
2012 in China
Spacecraft launched by Long March rockets